Burning Sands is a 2017 American drama film, directed by Gerard McMurray, from a screenplay by McMurray and Christine Berg. It stars Trevor Jackson, Alfre Woodard, Steve Harris, Tosin Cole, DeRon Horton and Trevante Rhodes.

The film had its world premiere at the Sundance Film Festival on January 24, 2017, before being released on March 10, 2017, by Netflix.

Plot

Five young men pledge Lambda Lambda Phi Fraternity at the historically Black institution, Frederick Douglass University.  Student Zurich leads the pledge class as they endure big brother hazing on campus and at line ups at fraternity house. The pledges balance their time in class with English professor Hughes and their new fraternity life of parties, sorority girls and dating.  The pledge class learns the brotherhood mottos and bonds together because of or despite moral and physical hazing.

Dean Richardson, a Lambda Phi alumnus, holds himself out as an example of the fraternity system and extols its virtues.  He makes himself available to be told of pledge abuse but not far enough to break the fraternity code of silence and secrecy.  One night the hazing goes too far and a big brother advises the pledge class to drop off a seriously injured pledge at the emergency room but to avoid the cameras.  Despite the advice, the young neophyte fraternity brothers wait together at the hospital awaiting the fate of their friend, Frank. After seconds of waiting the doctor tells them that Frank died of a ruptured aorta artery. Zurich takes out his cell phone and calls his dad, realizing why his father never joined the fraternity, and the movie ends.

Cast
 Trevor Jackson as Zurich
 Alfre Woodard as Professor Hughes 
 Steve Harris as Dean Richardson
 Tosin Cole as Frank
 DeRon Horton as Earnest (Square)
 Dominique Mari as Tiffany
 Mitchell Edwards as Stephon
 Jeremy Rudd as Christopher
 Christian Robinson as Big Country
 Trevante Rhodes as Fernander 
 Malik Bazille as Dwight
 Octavius J Johnson as Ron
 Rotimi Akinosho as Edwin
 Serayah as Angel
 Nafessa Williams as Toya
 Imani Hakim as Rochon
 Adriyan Rae as Candy
 Racquel Bianca John as Joy
 Chiké Okonkwo as Breyton

Production
In January 2016, it was announced Gerard McMurray would direct the film, from a screenplay by himself and Christine Berg, while Stephanie Allain, Jason Michael Berman of Mandalay Pictures, Reginald Hudlin and Shawn Knapp will serve as producers on the film alongside Netflix. In January 2017, Common boarded the film as an executive producer and will contribute an original song to the film.

Release
The film had its world premiere at the Sundance Film Festival on January 24, 2017. It was released on March 10, 2017, by Netflix.

Reception
Burning Sands received positive reviews from film critics. It currently holds an 87% approval rating on review aggregator Rotten Tomatoes, based on 23 reviews, with an average rating of 7.1/10. On Metacritic, the film has a weighted average rating of 63 out of 100, based on 7 reviews, indicating "generally favorable reviews".

See also
 List of black films of the 2010s
 School Daze (1988)

References

External links
 

2017 films
2017 independent films
American drama films
Films about fraternities and sororities
Films shot in Virginia
English-language Netflix original films
2017 directorial debut films
Films about hazing
2010s English-language films
2010s American films